Seioptera vibrans is a species of ulidiid or picture-winged fly in the genus Seioptera of the family Ulidiidae.

References

External links
Images representing  Seioptera vibrans at BOLD

Ulidiidae
Insects described in 1758
Diptera of Europe
Taxa named by Carl Linnaeus